Father's Dilemma is a 1950 Italian comedy film directed by Alessandro Blasetti. It won an award at the Venice Film Festival.

Details
 The voice of the narrator is Alberto Sordi. When Sordi worked on the film he had just finished dubbing the Atoll K with main characters Laurel and Hardy.
 Various sequences of the Italian neo-realist film Prima Comunione were filmed on the exterior double stair of the Church of Santi Domenico e Sisto, the university church of the Pontifical University of Saint Thomas Aquinas, Angelicum.
 Prima comunione has been put on the list of the 100 Italian films to be saved.

Cast
Aldo Fabrizi	as	Mr. Carloni
Gaby Morlay		as	Maria Carloni
Ludmilla Dudarova		as	Signorina Ludovisi
Lucien Baroux		as	The Archbishop
Enrico Viarisio		as	L'uomo del filobus
Andreina Mazzotto		as	Anna Carloni
Adriana Gallandt		as	Antonia, la cameriera
Ernesto Almirante		as		L'invitato anziano
Aldo Silvani		as	Inquilino con scarpe rumorose
Lauro Gazzolo		as	Cliente che compro l'uovo pasquale
Max Elloy		as	Lo spazzino
Jean Tissier		as	Il medico sul taxi
Amedeo Trilli		as	Il vigile urbano (as Amedeo Novelli)
Dante Maggio		as		Metropolitano che regola il trafico
Carlo Romano		as	Il tassista

References

External links
 

1950 films
1950s Italian-language films
1950 comedy films
Films directed by Alessandro Blasetti
Films set in Rome
Films with screenplays by Suso Cecchi d'Amico
Films with screenplays by Cesare Zavattini
Italian comedy films
Films scored by Alessandro Cicognini
Italian black-and-white films
1950s Italian films